Talia is the surname of:

 Daniel Talia (born 1991), Australian rules football player, brother of Michael
 Frank Talia (born 1972), Australian former football goalkeeper
 Michael Talia (born 1993), former Australian rules footballer, brother of Daniel
 Milack Talia (born 1977), American politician

See also
 Rashid Ṭaliʽa (1877–1926), Jordanian politician